Saab or SAAB may refer to:

Brands and enterprises
 Saab Group, a Swedish aerospace and defence company, formerly known as SAAB, and later as Saab AB
 Datasaab, a former computer company, started as spin off from Saab AB
 Saab Automobile, a former Swedish automobile manufacturer, formerly a division of Saab AB
 SAABO, a caravan (camper/travel trailer) produced by Saab Automobile from 1964 to 1968
 Saab-Scania, the former corporate group formed by Saab AB and Scania-Vabis

People with the surname
 Alejandro Saab (born 1994), American voice actor
 Alex Saab (born 1971), Colombian businessman charged with money laundering
 Elie Saab (born 1964), Lebanese fashion designer
 Hassan Saab (born 1922), Lebanese diplomat and political scientist
 Jocelyne Saab (1948–2019), Lebanese filmmaker
 Karin Saab (born 2001), Venezuelan footballer
 Tarek Saab (born 1963), Venezuelan politician
 Tarek Saab (born 1978), candidate on The Apprentice
 Valeska Saab (born 1984), Ecuadorian beauty queen and politician
 Jason Saab (born 1999), Australian rugby league player

Other uses
 Sex assigned at birth (SAAB or SAB), referring to sex assignment at birth
 Space: Above and Beyond or S:AAB, an American science fiction television series
 Student African American Brotherhood or SAAB

See also

 Sabb (disambiguation)
Sahib